Non Nước Village, known as "marble village" (làng đá Non Nước) is a village near Non Nước caves and beach in Da Nang, Vietnam. The area is part of 1 of the 21 National Tourism Areas.

References

Populated places in Da Nang